A meta-organization is defined as an organization that is formed of other organizations, rather than by individuals. This concept was developed in the scope of management studies in 2005 by Göran Ahrne and Nils Brunsson. Meta-organization design is suggested to differ from organization design in that intra-firm design may have less of an authority in the former.

References 

Organizational structure
Organizational theory